The men's decathlon event at the 2019 European Athletics U23 Championships was held in Gävle, Sweden, at Gavlehof Stadium Park on 13 and 14 July.

Results

References

Decathlon
Combined events at the European Athletics U23 Championships